Anne Marie Wibble (born Anne Ohlin on 13 October 1943 in Stockholm – 14 March 2000 in Stockholm) was a Swedish politician who served as Minister for Finance from 1991 to 1994, the first woman to hold the post. She was a member of the Liberal People's Party. She was the daughter of Bertil Ohlin, a 1977 Nobel Memorial Prize in Economic Sciences laureate.

Education 
Wibble graduated from the Stockholm School of Economics in 1966, then studied at Stanford University where she took an M.A. degree in 1967. In 1973 she took a licentiate degree in economics at the Stockholm School of Economics, where she also was a teacher from 1967 to 1977.

Political career 
Wibble worked for the Liberal People's Party in the Swedish government offices and the Swedish parliament from 1980 to 1986. She was a member of parliament from the 1985 election. In the 1991 election, a centre-right coalition won and Wibble was appointed Minister of Finance in the Bildt Cabinet. She stayed in office to the 1994 election, which the government lost. Wibble returned to parliament, and ran for party leader in 1995, but lost to Maria Leissner. She remained a member of parliament until the end of 1997, after which she became the chief economist of the Federation of Swedish Industry.

She died from cancer in 2000.

References

External links 
 

1943 births
2000 deaths
Politicians from Stockholm
Members of the Riksdag from the Liberals (Sweden)
Swedish Ministers for Finance
Stockholm School of Economics alumni
Women government ministers of Sweden
Members of the Riksdag 1985–1988
Members of the Riksdag 1988–1991
Members of the Riksdag 1991–1994
Members of the Riksdag 1994–1998
Women members of the Riksdag
20th-century Swedish women politicians
Female finance ministers